The sego lily (Calochortus nuttallii) is a bulbous perennial endemic to the Western U.S., and is the state flower of Utah.

Sego Lily may also refer to:

Sego Lily, the newsletter of the Utah Native Plant Society
Sego Lily School, Salt Lake City, U.S., a Sudbury school

See also
Sego (disambiguation)